Balangan-e Olya (also Romanized as Bālangān-e ‘Olyā; also known as Bālangū, Bālangū-ye Bālā, and Bālangū-ye ‘Olyā) is a village in Rostam-e Do Rural District, in the Central District of Rostam County, Fars Province, Iran. At the 2006 census, its population was 70, in 13 families.

References 

Populated places in Rostam County